Mossman is a Scottish and Northern English surname, originally of Dutch or Flemish origin.

People with the name
 Bina Mossman (1893–1990), American musician and politician
 Brooke T. Mossman, American pathologist
 Burton C. Mossman (1867–1956), American lawman and cattleman
 Dave Mossman (born 1964), English footballer
 Douglas Mossman (1933–2021), American actor
 Dow Mossman (born 1943), American author
 Francis Mossman (born 1988), New Zealand actor, model, and journalist
 David James Mossman (1926–1971), British broadcaster
 John Mossman (1817–1890), English sculptor
 Judith Mossman (disambiguation)
 Karen Mossman, Canadian virologist
 Matilda Mossman, American basketball coach
 Maunakea Mossman (born 1975), American professional wrestler
 Michael Philip Mossman (born 1959), American jazz trumpeter
 Stuart Mossman (1942–1999), American guitar maker and entertainer
 William Mossman (1793–1851), Scottish sculptor

See also
 Mossman (disambiguation)
 Mosman (disambiguation)

References

Surnames of English origin
Occupational surnames
Scottish surnames
Surnames of Dutch origin